István Bujtor (5 May 1942 – 25 September 2009), born István Frenreisz, was a Hungarian actor, director, producer and screenplay writer. He starred in the TV mini-series Mathias Sandorf based on the novel Mathias Sandorf by Jules Verne as Mathias Sandorf in 1979.

Biography 
Bujtor started his acting career in 1964, and played in more than a hundred Hungarian films. He won the Béla Balázs Award in 1979.

In the early 1980s he became known as the Hungarian voice of Bud Spencer. Based on his real life similarity with Spencer, later a series of Hungarian comedies were created in the Bud Spencer-Terence Hill genre, in which Bujtor played hard-hitting detective Csöpi Ötvös partnered with fellow Hungarian actor András Kern.

In January 2008 he became the director of the Petőfi Theatre in Veszprém.

Personal 
He was born in Budapest in 1942, as a child of a prestigious family; his grandfather was the legendary restaurant owner and gourmet Károly Gundel, and his siblings were the popular Hungarian actor Zoltán Latinovits (half-brother) and the composer and bass guitarist Károly Frenreisz. Bujtor graduated as an economist in 1965. He was passionate yachtsman winning six Hungarian championships with his yacht Rabonbán, built in 1936.

Death 
Bujtor was hospitalized in Veszprém on 31 July 2009, where he fell into a coma. After several weeks of treatment his health status seemingly stabilized and he was transferred to Budapest for rehabilitation. However, he died there on 25 September 2009. The circumstances of his death are currently undisclosed but he was reportedly diagnosed with coccidiosis, kidney failure and septic shock.

Selected filmography

Notes

References

External links
 
 Filmography on port.hu

1942 births
2009 deaths
Hungarian male film actors
Hungarian film directors
Hungarian film producers
Male screenwriters
Hungarian male writers
Male actors from Budapest
20th-century Hungarian screenwriters